Eric DeCosta (born April 10, 1971) is an American football executive who is the executive vice president and general manager for the Baltimore Ravens of the National Football League (NFL), a position he officially assumed on January 11, 2019.

DeCosta has been with the Ravens organization since 1996 and previously served as assistant general manager under Ozzie Newsome from 2012 to 2018.

Early life and education
DeCosta attended high school at Taunton High School (Taunton, Massachusetts) and played college football at Colby College, where he served as team captain in 1992 under head coach, Tom Austin. A Dean's List student who graduated with honors, DeCosta earned bachelor of art's degrees in English and Classical Civilizations in 1993. In 1996, DeCosta received a master's degree in English from Trinity College, Hartford.

Executive career

Baltimore Ravens
Prior to his stint in the NFL, DeCosta worked at Trinity College (1993–1996) as a Graduate Fellow, coaching football in the Athletic Department.

Named as one of the most powerful people in sports under the age of 35, DeCosta has played a strong role in the drafting of Pro Bowl players like Ed Reed, Terrell Suggs, Jamal Lewis, Bart Scott, Le'Ron McClain, Haloti Ngata, Marshal Yanda, Ben Grubbs, Ray Rice , C. J. Mosley, Brandon Williams, and Kyle Juszczyk along with significant contributors Tony Weaver, Mark Clayton, Chester Taylor, Ed Hartwell, Dawan Landry, Jason Brown, Jared Gaither,  Sam Koch, Lardarius Webb, Torrey Smith, Ricky Wagner, Pernell McPhee, and Kelechi Osemele.

In April 2008, DeCosta and the Ravens traded the eighth pick in the 2008 Draft to the Jacksonville Jaguars for the 26th pick in the first round and other picks. The Ravens then traded the 26th overall pick and their third round pick to the Houston Texans for the 18th pick, where the Ravens then selected 2008 Diet Pepsi Rookie of the Year winner, QB Joe Flacco from the University of Delaware. In his first season as Ravens starting quarterback, Flacco led the Ravens to the AFC Championship Game, where they lost to the eventual Super Bowl Champion Pittsburgh Steelers.

The next year, in April 2009, DeCosta and Newsome traded the 26th pick in the 2009 Draft and another pick to the New England Patriots for the 23rd pick in the first round.  The Ravens then selected 2009 Offensive Rookie of the Year runner-up Michael Oher, OT, from Ole Miss. Oher was featured in Michael Lewis' acclaimed book, The Blind Side: Evolution of a Game which was also made into a movie starring Sandra Bullock.

In January 2010, after reportedly being a finalist for the Seattle Seahawks General Manager position, DeCosta removed his name from consideration prior to interviewing for the post.

One year later in March 2011, in an interview at the annual Owners' Meetings in New Orleans, Louisiana, Ravens owner Steve Bisciotti referred to DeCosta as General Manager Ozzie Newsome's eventual successor.

DeCosta was on the radar for several teams with General Manager openings following the 2011 season including serious interest from the Chicago Bears. However, in January 2012 DeCosta signed a new contract with Baltimore that would make him one of the highest paid executives in football and ensure that he stayed on as Ozzie Newsome's eventual replacement.

On February 2, 2018, the Ravens officially announced that DeCosta would take over as General Manager for Ozzie Newsome following the 2018 season. That year, the Ravens made news on draft day by trading their second round pick in the 2019 NFL Draft to the Eagles in exchange for Philadelphia's 2018 first round pick, the last pick of the round. Newsome and DeCosta used that pick to select QB Lamar Jackson from Louisville. Jackson finished the 2018 season as the starting quarterback for the Ravens, leading the Ravens over the last seven games to a 6-1 record and an AFC North championship.  The Ravens played a home playoff game vs the Los Angeles Chargers on January 5, losing to the Chargers and being eliminated from the playoffs in the process. Jackson was the youngest quarterback to ever start a playoff game.

DeCosta's first off-season (2019) as General Manager was defined by a series of moves that were controversial at the outset  DeCosta's first move was trading QB Joe Flacco to the Denver Broncos for a 4th round draft pick in the 2019 NFL Draft (later used to select RB Justice Hill).  The Ravens reached a long-term contracts with Nick Boyle, from Delaware, regarded as being one of the better blocking tight ends in the league, and Tavon Young, a CB who played at Temple and was a fourth-round pick in 2017.   At the start of the new league year, DeCosta allowed four starters from the 2018 Ravens defense to test the free-agency market, Pro Bowl linebacker C.J. Mosley, outside linebacker Za'Darius Smith, Pro Bowl outside linebacker Terrell Suggs, and Pro Bowl safety Eric Weddle. All four players subsequently reached lucrative deals with other teams, creating major voids on the Ravens roster.

In response, the Ravens and DeCosta surprised the NFL and reached a four-year agreement with All-Pro safety Earl Thomas and a three-year contract with running back Mark Ingram.  They also extended Pro Bowl kicker Justin Tucker and selected WR Marquise Brown, OLB Jaylon Ferguson, WR Miles Boykin, RB Justice Hill, and OG Ben Powers among others in the 2019 NFL Selection Draft.

DeCosta made three training-camp trades with other teams that fortified the roster and accumulated additional draft picks for the 2020 Draft. The Ravens traded OG Alex Lewis to the NY Jets for a 7th round draft pick (later used to select safety Geno Stone out of Iowa). Also, the Ravens got a 5th round pick from the Minnesota Vikings for Kaare Vedvik, an undrafted punter/kicker who was not going to make the 53-man roster due to Justin Tucker and Sam Koch. Vedvik was cut by the Vikings prior to week 1 of the regular season.   Lastly, the Ravens traded OG/OT Jermaine Eluemunor and a 6th round pick to the New England Patriots for their 4th round pick (later used to select LB Malik Harrison from Ohio State in the 2020 NFL Draft).

The Ravens started the season 2-2 before winning their remaining twelve regular season games and finishing with the best record in the NFL (14-2) in the 2019 season.  Along the way, just before the trade deadline, DeCosta made a season-changing trade by dealing a 5th round pick and LB Kenny Young to the Los Angeles Rams for CB Marcus Peters, a move that seemingly fortified the Ravens defense. DeCosta also reached extensions with Pro Bowl fullback Patrick Ricard and veteran wide receiver Willie Snead during the 2019 campaign.  Earning the #1 seed in the AFC and a first-round playoff bye, the Ravens, despite being huge favorites, were beaten in the Divisional Round (January 12, 2020) by the Tennessee Titans at home in Baltimore.

Ravens players and coaches accumulated many accolades after the historic 2019 regular season, including thirteen Pro Bowl players (including Ingram, Thomas, and Peters), Coach of the Year John Harbaugh, and NFL MVP Lamar Jackson.

On May 28, 2020, DeCosta was named NFL Executive of the Year by Sporting News for his work throughout the 2019 off-season and regular season. This award, as voted by his peers, dates back to 1955 and features recipients like Dan Reeves, George Halas, Al Davis, Tex Schramm, Bobby Beathard, George Young, Bill Polian, and Ron Wolf, among others.

References

1971 births
Living people
Baltimore Ravens executives
Colby Mules football players
People from Taunton, Massachusetts